was the 22nd head of the Fushimi-no-miya shinnōke (branch of the Imperial Family). He was a field marshal in the Imperial Japanese Army.

Early life 
Prince Sadanaru was born in Kyoto as the fourteenth son of Prince Fushimi Kuniie (1802–1875) and the second son of Princess Takatsukasa Hiroko; he was thus the half brother of Prince Yamashina Akira, Prince Kuni Asahiko, Prince Kitashirakawa Yoshihisa, and Prince Kan'in Kotohito. He succeeded his father as the head of the Fushimi-no-miya family in 1875.

Marriage and family 
In 1872, Prince Fushimi Sadanaru married Princess Arisugawa Toshiko (1858–1927), the daughter of Prince Arisugawa Takahito, with whom he had two sons (Kunika and Akinori). Two concubines bore Prince Hiroyasu and Princess Sachiko respectively.
 
 
 
 ; married Count Toyokage Yamauchi.

Prince Kunika would become the legitimate heir to his father, but, due to his illness, Fushimi-no-miya was eventually succeeded by his elder half-brother, Prince Hiroyasu.

Career 

A career army officer, Prince Sadanaru entered the military academy in 1873 and fought as a lieutenant in the Satsuma Rebellion. Promoted to captain in 1878, he studied military tactics at the École Spéciale Militaire de Saint-Cyr in France and later in Germany in the 1870s. Upon his return to Japan, he was promoted to major in 1881 and advocated the establishment of a Japanese version of an army General Staff based on the Prussian model. He was promoted to lieutenant colonel in 1884, colonel in 1887 and to major general in 1889. He was awarded the Grand Cordon of the Order of the Chrysanthemum in 1886.

Major General Prince Fushimi Sadanaru served as a field commander in the First Sino-Japanese War (1894–1895), commanding the IJA 4th Division, and landing with his forces in the Liaodong Peninsula, China in 1894. He subsequently participated in the 1895 Japanese invasion of Taiwan.

He represented Emperor Meiji at the coronation of Tsar Nicholas II of Russia on May 26, 1896. In 1898, he was promoted to lieutenant general and assigned command of the Himeji-based IJA 10th Division. In 1901, he became commander of the IJA 1st Division.

In 1904, with the start of the Russo-Japanese War he again landed with his forces in the Liaodong Peninsula. In June, he was promoted to full general, and recalled to Japan to serve on the Supreme War Council, before being sent by Emperor Meiji on a diplomatic mission to the United States. After the conclusion of the Treaty of Portsmouth, he was sent to England again on a mission of thanks from the Japanese government for British advice and assistance during the war. During this mission, he also stopped in Honolulu for a visit with the Japanese community there. In 1909, he was again sent on a diplomatic mission, this time to China. Prince Fushimi also represented Japan at the state funeral of Great Britain's King Edward VII May 20, 1910. He met with the new King George V at Buckingham Palace.

Prince Fushimi was a close advisor to then-Crown Prince Yoshihito (later Emperor Taishō). After the death of Emperor Meiji in 1912, he served as Lord Keeper of the Privy Seal of Japan from 1912 to 1915, thus becoming the only imperial prince to have served in that office.

He was promoted to the largely ceremonial rank of field marshal in 1915, and awarded the Grand Collar of the Supreme Order of the Chrysanthemum in 1916.

Death
The Prince died of influenza on February 5, 1923, at his vacation home in Cape Inubō and was accorded a state funeral. Dowager Princess Fushimi Toshiko died on January 3, 1930. He was succeeded by his son, Fleet Admiral Prince Fushimi Hiroyasu.

Honors 
His Japanese decorations include the Collar and Grand Cordon of the Supreme Order of the Chrysanthemum, Grand Cordon of the Order of the Rising Sun with Paulownia Flowers, Grand Cordon of the Order of the Sacred Treasure, Order of the Golden Kite (2nd Class). In addition, other honors and decorations included:
 : Grand Cross of the Order of Kamehameha I, 27 April 1883
 : Grand Cross of the Red Eagle, 18 September 1886
 :
 Grand Cross of Saints Maurice and Lazarus, 18 September 1886
 Knight of the Annunciation, 3 May 1910
 : Grand Cross of the Imperial Order of Leopold, 18 September 1886
   Sweden-Norway: Grand Cross of St. Olav, 1 July 1886
 : Grand Cordon of the Royal Order of Leopold, 5 October 1886
 : Grand Cross of the Dannebrog, 7 October 1886
 :
 Knight of St. Alexander Nevsky, 25 May 1896
 Knight of St. Andrew, 4 June 1910
 : Grand Cross of the Legion of Honour, 16 April 1897
 : Order of the Double Dragon, Class I Grade II, 27 November 1904; Class I Grade I, 27 April 1909
 : Honorary Grand Cross of the Bath (military), 1907

Gallery

Ancestry

Notes

References

 Jansen, Marius B. and Gilbert Rozman, eds. (1986). Japan in Transition: from Tokugawa to Meiji. Princeton: Princeton University Press. ;  OCLC 12311985
  . (2000). The Making of Modern Japan. Cambridge: Harvard University Press. ;  OCLC 44090600

 Takenobu, Yoshitaro. (1906). The Japan Year Book. Tokyo: Japan Year Book Office.  OCLC 1771764

External links
 

Japanese princes
Fushimi-no-miya
1858 births
1923 deaths
Marshals of Japan
Japanese military personnel of the First Sino-Japanese War
Japanese military personnel of the Russo-Japanese War
Japanese generals
People of Meiji-period Japan
People from Chōshi
People from Kyoto
Deaths from influenza
Infectious disease deaths in Japan
École Spéciale Militaire de Saint-Cyr alumni
Recipients of the Order of the Golden Kite, 2nd class
Recipients of the Order of the Rising Sun with Paulownia Flowers
Recipients of the Order of the Sacred Treasure, 1st class
Knights Grand Cross of the Order of Saints Maurice and Lazarus
Grand Croix of the Légion d'honneur
Grand Crosses of the Order of the Dannebrog
Honorary Knights Grand Cross of the Order of the Bath